Aleksander Tupalski (5 October 1900 – 9 January 1980) was a Polish ice hockey and football player. He played for the Poland national team at the 1928 Winter Olympics. Born in Germany, he grew up in St. Petersburg before moving to Warsaw for education. He served in the Polish-Soviet War and Second World War, and after 1945 moved to France and subsequently Australia, working in aviation and then as a mechanic.

Biography
Born in Gelsenkirchen, Germany, he spent his youth in St. Petersburg. In 1918 he went to Warsaw to study at the Warsaw University of Technology. He volunteered for the army in 1919, joining the 1st Krechowce Uhlan Regiment and serving in the Polish-Soviet War. At the onset of the Second World War he moved to Lwów (now Lviv), and eventually France. He worked in aviation during the war, receiving recognition from both the Polish and British militaries. He continued working in aviation in France, until 1951 when he moved to Australia, becoming a mechanic in Sydney. He died in Canberra in 1980. Tupalski was married to Jadwiga Matyjewicz.

Sport career

Football
Tupalski first played football in St. Petersburg with his school's team. His first matches in Poland were while serving with the Uhlans. After the end of the Polish-Soviet War in 1921 he joined AZS Warszawa, playing with them until 1923 when he switched to Polonia Warsaw. He played three international matches for Poland, scoring one goal.

Ice hockey
Tupalski's first ice hockey team was also AZS Warszawa. During his career he was regarded as one of the best Polish ice hockey players, scoring 29 goals in 34 matches, while playing both as a forward and defenceman. He played at the 1928 Winter Olympics with Poland, scoring his lone goal against Austria. He helped Poland win silver at the 1929 European Championship. Two years later at the 1931 World Championship, which concurrently served as the European Championship, Tupalski helped Poland again win silver.

References

Citations

Bibliography

External links
 

1900 births
1980 deaths
AZS Warszawa (ice hockey) players
Ice hockey players at the 1928 Winter Olympics
Olympic ice hockey players of Poland
Polish footballers
Polish ice hockey coaches
Polish ice hockey forwards
Poland international footballers
Poland men's national ice hockey team coaches
Polonia Warsaw players
Sportspeople from Gelsenkirchen
Warsaw University of Technology alumni
Association footballers not categorized by position
Polish people of the Polish–Soviet War
Polish emigrants to Australia